Bulbophyllum muscohaerens is a species of orchid in the genus Bulbophyllum. It was found in Boneo (Sabah, Sarawak).

Bibliography
 Wood, J.J., Beaman, T.E., Lamb, A., Lun, C.C. & Beaman, J.H. (2011). The Orchids of Mount Kinabalu 2: 1–726. Natural history publications (Borneo), Kota Kinabalu, Malaysia.
 Govaerts, R. (2003). World Checklist of Monocotyledons Database in ACCESS: 1–71827. The Board of Trustees of the Royal Botanic Gardens, Kew.
 Govaerts, R. (1996). World Checklist of Seed Plants 2(1, 2): 1–492. Continental Publishing, Deurne.

References

External links
The Bulbophyllum-Checklist
The Internet Orchid Species Photo Encyclopedia

muscohaerens